Science in a Free Society is the 2nd full length book by the Austrian philosopher of science, Paul Feyerabend. It was published in 1978 by Schocken Books and later reprinted by Verso Books. While Feyerabend never published a second edition, Verso pressed four copies in 1982, 1983, 1985, and 1987.

Parts of the book were reprinted in later editions of Against Method. The book largely develops arguments from the first edition of Against Method and spells out their political implications. The book also contains a collection of previously published material in which he responds to some of his critics of Against Method. Feyerabend also published, in German, Erkenntnis Fur freie Menschen (Knowledge for Free People), which contains roughly two-thirds of the material from Science in a Society while expanding on some sections and diminishing others.

Translations
Science in a Free Society has been translated into 6 languages:
 Japanese translation: Jiyujin no tameno chi: Kagakuron no kaitai e, Shin'yosha: Tokyo 1982, ix+333 pp.
 Spanish translation by Alberto Elena: La ciencia en una sociedad libre, Siglo XXI de España: Madrid 1982, 272 pp.
 Turkish translation by Ahmet Kardam: Özgür Bir Toplumda Bilim, Ayrıntı: Istanbul 1987 [reprint 1999], 265 pp.
 Chinese translation by Yazhu Lan, Shangahi Translation Publishing House: Sahnghai 1990, 257 pp.
 Arabic translation by al-Sayyid Nafadi: al-‘Ilm fī mujtama‘ ḥurr, al-Majlis al-A'lá lil-Thaqāfah: al-Qāhirah 2000, 162 pp.
 Portuguese translation by Vera Joscelyne: A Ciência em uma sociedade livre, UNESP: São Paulo 2011.

Content
The book is divided into three sections. The first section, entitled "Reason and Practice", develops Feyerabend's theory of rationality as something embedded in, rather than separate from, traditions. The second section, "Science in a Free Society", develops Feyerabend's views about the place of science in democratic societies. The final section, "Conversations with Illiterates", provides responses to criticisms of Against Method.

Reason and Practice
The first section develops a version of Protagorean relativism. Feyerabend argues against two views: idealism, which he defines as the view that the authority of reason is independent from tradition and practice, and naturalism or the view that the authority of reason derives from practice. Idealism is wrong, Feyerabend argues, because the authority of reason depends on its ability to be integrated into a coherent practice. If one were to apply a view of rationality to practice and the practice were to suffer, then the theory of rationality can be rejected. Naturalism is wrong because it treats the norms that already happen to be in practice dogmatically. Feyerabend develops a view that synthesizes elements of each, which he claims amounts to a form of relativism.

To allow for collective decision making when traditions conflict, Feyerabend argues for two kinds of dialogues: "guided" and "open" exchanges. Guided exchanges require shared assumptions that 'guide' the deliberation process whereas open exchanges have no prior constraints introduced upon dialogue.

Science in a Free Society
The second section spells out the political implications of relativism. Feyerabend argues against the view that there should be 'experts' who dictate policy decisions and that experts should be supervised by democratically representative laypeople. He argues that expertise is often exaggerated and laypeople are competent enough to criticize their views. This includes scientific experts. Because of this, Feyerabend thinks that science and the state should be separated in an analogous way as the religion and the state are separated in secular societies.

Conversations with Illiterates
The final section collects some of Feyerabend's previously published responses to criticisms of Against Method. This section is largely polemical and argues that many of his critics suffered from illiteracy.

Scholarly Response
Responses to Science in a Free Society were mixed, but largely positive.

Bibliography 

 
 
 
 
 
 
 
 
 
 
 
 

1978 non-fiction books
English-language books
Books by Paul Feyerabend
Philosophy of science
Science studies
Criticism of science
Schocken Books books